James McCrea (1848–1913) was the president of the Pennsylvania Railroad from 1907 to 1913.

Biography
James  was born May 1, 1848 in Philadelphia, United States, in a long line of McCreas who came to Delaware and Pennsylvania near two hundred years earlier.  His parents were James Alexander McCrea and Ann Bispham Foster.  He attended the Pennsylvania Polytechnic College, gaining an education in civil engineering.

He began railroad work with the Connellsville & Southern Pennsylvania Railroad in June 1865.  In December 1867 he began work on the Wilmington & Reading Railroad, and in September 1868 with the Allegheny Valley Railroad. In March 1871 he began work with the Pennsylvania Railroad as principal assistant engineer working on construction.  He advanced rapidly from that point.  In 1874 he became assistant engineer of maintenance of way of the Philadelphia Division, then division superintendent of the Middle Division in January 1875, and of the New York Division in October 1878.  In May 1882 he was transferred to Columbus, Ohio to become manager of the Pittsburgh, Cincinnati & St. Louis Railroad—the Pennsylvania Railroad's principal subsidiary between Pittsburgh and St. Louis.  In October 1885 he became general manager.  The Pennsylvania Railroad named him fourth vice president in October 1887, in March 1890 second vice president, and in April 1891 first vice president.  The vice presidencies gave him responsibility for the lines west of Pittsburgh.
	
In June 1899 he was named a director of the Pennsylvania Railroad when Alexander J. Cassatt was made the road's president.  When Cassatt died in January 1907, McCrea became the president and held the position until January 1913, when he resigned, in part because of his health. During his presidency the Pennsylvania built the Hudson River tunnels and Pennsylvania Station in New York City.

McCrea also served as president of a considerable number of subsidiary roads:  Philadelphia, Baltimore & Washington; Northern Central; West Jersey & Seashore; Pittsburgh, Cincinnati, Chicago & St. Louis; Grand Rapids & Indiana; and Indiana & Lake Michigan.  He completed the construction of Pennsylvania Station (New York) in 1910, bringing the PRR lines under the Hudson River and, for the first time, into New York City and the Second Vice-President of the company, John Borland Thayer died in the sinking of RMS Titanic.

A biographer wrote "his success has been achieved by his ability, his practical knowledge of details, his sound judgment, and his indefatigable application to the arduous duties of railroad work.  He is a man of most affable manner, generous disposition, profound insight, and acute, though humane sense of justice."

He married Ada Jane Montgomery on February 12, 1873, and the couple had three children. The oldest son, James Alexander McCrea, followed his father in a career with the Pennsylvania Railroad.

James McCrea died March 28, 1913 at Ballyheather, his home at Haverford, Pennsylvania. Ada died October 20, 1926.  Both are interred at West Laurel Hill Cemetery, Bala Cynwyd, Pennsylvania.

References

External links
 

Pennsylvania Railroad people
19th-century American railroad executives
20th-century American railroad executives
Members of the Philadelphia Club
1848 births
1913 deaths
Burials at West Laurel Hill Cemetery